"This One's for You" is the title track from the 1976 album by Barry Manilow with words and music by Manilow and Marty Panzer.  The song peaked at number 29 on the Billboard Hot 100, and at number one on the Easy Listening chart, reaching the top position for one week in November 1976, Manilow's fifth number one overall on that chart.  

An early version of the song appears on Manilow's compilation box set, The Complete Collection and Then Some....

Reception
Cash Box said that the song "is perfectly constructed with a commercial feeling in mind" and "a lovely ballad, with touching lyric." Record World said that it is "sung with [Manilow's] inimitable flair."

Chicago radio superstation WLS, which gave the song much airplay, ranked "This One's for You" as the 66th most popular hit of 1976.
It reached as high as number seven on their survey of November 6, 1976.

Chart performance

Weekly charts

Year-end charts

Cover versions
Shirley Bassey on her 1977 album, You Take My Heart Away.

Teddy Pendergrass for his 1982 album of the same name.

 Filipino singer Kuh Ledesma covered this song in medley with Elton John's breakthrough hit "Your Song" in 1983.

See also
List of number-one adult contemporary singles of 1976 (U.S.)

References

External links
 

1976 songs
1976 singles
Barry Manilow songs
Songs written by Barry Manilow
Song recordings produced by Ron Dante
Songs with lyrics by Marty Panzer
Torch songs
Arista Records singles